Pedasus or Pedasos was a town of ancient Messenia, mentioned by Homer in the Iliad as one of the seven towns of Messenia offered by Agamemnon to Achilles, and described by him as ἀμπελόεσσα ('vine-covered'). Ancient authors identify its location with the later Methone.

References

Populated places in ancient Messenia
Former populated places in Greece
Locations in the Iliad